Robert Windsor-Clive may refer to:

Robert Windsor-Clive (MP) (1824–1859), British politician
Robert Windsor-Clive, 1st Earl of Plymouth (1857–1923), politician, son of the above

See also 
 Robert Clive (disambiguation)